Cobbins Brook is a minor tributary of the River Lea. It forms to the north of Epping, Essex and flows past Epping Upland, Waltham Abbey until it joins the River Lee Flood Relief Channel below the M25 near Rammey Marsh.

Queen Boudica 
A local legend claims Boudica's rebellion against the Romans ended in the Waltham Abbey neighbourhood when she poisoned herself with hemlock gathered from the banks of Cobbins Brook.

External links 
British history online
Cobbins Brook flood alleviation scheme Retrieved 19 May 2010

References 

Rivers of Essex
Tributaries of the River Lea
1Cobbins